Rendezvous Mountain is a large mountain massif located in the southern Teton Range in the U.S. state of Wyoming. The highest point on Rendezvous Mountain is Rendezvous Peak. The west and northern flanks of the mountain are in Grand Teton National Park, Wyoming, while much of the remainder of the massif is in Bridger-Teton National Forest. Though there are numerous summits above , the one that is most commonly visited is the North Peak, where the Jackson Hole Mountain Resort aerial tram provides access to the summit for skiers in the winter and sightseerings and hikers in the summer.

Cited references

Mountains of Grand Teton National Park
Mountains of Wyoming
Mountains of Teton County, Wyoming